Turo Järvinen is a Finnish former professional ice hockey forward who last played for HIFK of the SM-liiga.

References

External links

Living people
HIFK (ice hockey) players
Finnish ice hockey forwards
HC Salamat players
Kiekko-Vantaa players
1982 births
Sportspeople from Vantaa